Sadashiva "Sadu" Karnik is an Indian-born American molecular biologist who is a Professor in the Molecular Medicine Department of Cleveland Clinic Lerner College of Medicine at Case Western Reserve University. He is also head of the Karnik-lab at the Lerner Research Institute of Cleveland Clinic.

Early life and education 
Sadu Karnik earned a B.Sc. degree in botany, zoology and chemistry from Sri Poornaprajna College, Udupi in 1973 and a M.Sc. degree in Clinical Biochemistry by research from Kasturba Medical College, Manipal. He entered the Indian Institute of Science, Department of Microbiology and Cell Biology Bengaluru in 1976 for doctoral studies on Mycobacteriophage in the laboratory of Prof. K.P Gopinathan. His post-doctoral studies were on Bacteriophage Qβ at the laboratory of molecular biologist Martin Billetter of the ETH Institute for Molecular Biology, University of Zurich, Switzerland. He later joined the laboratory of Har Gobind Khorana at Massachusetts Institute of Technology to study disulfide-bonding in integral membrane proteins. He became a naturalized citizen of the United States in 1995.

Career 
Karnik started his independent laboratory at the Cleveland Clinic research foundation as assistant staff studying Angiotensin receptor molecular biology and was promoted to full-staff in 2002. In 2000 he received conjoint appointment as professor of chemistry and biology at Cleveland State University (CSU), Cleveland, OH, and in 2003, he became Professor (non-tenure track) of Molecular Medicine in the newly accredited Cleveland Clinic Lerner College of Medicine (CCLCM) at Case Western Reserve University, Cleveland, Ohio. His research programs have been supported by National Institutes of Health funding continuously for the past 25 years.

Research 
The Karnik-lab is known for first reporting of constitutive activation, atypical G protein coupling, biased ligand signaling, X-ray structure of antihypertensive drug bound angiotensin receptor, and structure-based allosteric ligand of Angiotensin receptors. These discoveries facilitated the development of novel transgenic models of cardiovascular diseases, β-arrestin biased agonists, next generation antihypertensive drugs and novel structures of GPCRs. His current research is aimed at developing novel allosteric ligand drugs for intervention in Preeclampsia due to autoimmunity and Hyperaldosteronism due to adrenal hyperplasia. In 1986 Sadu Karnik and colleagues at MIT reported that production of a functional, light sensing-state of rhodopsin depended on formation of a unique disulfide bond that is conserved in >90% GPCRs. The Karnik-lab at Cleveland Clinic extended this finding to other hormone and neurotransmitter GPCRs including β-adrenegic and Angiotensin Receptors.

Awards and honors 
Karnik won several fellowships including the Junior Research Fellowship of the Indian Institute of Science, Department of Science Technology (India) Senior Research Fellowship and the Swiss National Science Foundation Fellowship.

 In 1999, he was awarded Established Investigator of American Heart Association
 In 2001 he earned the Astra-Zeneca Basic Research Award
 In 2013 he became Chair of IUPHAR Committee on Angiotensin Receptors and continues his service in that position.

Selected bibliography 

 
<

References 

Living people
American molecular biologists
Cleveland Clinic people
Year of birth missing (living people)